is a Japanese football player who plays for  Sint-Truiden.

Career
Daiki Hashioka joined J1 League club Urawa Reds in 2017. On August 30, he debuted in J.League Cup (v Cerezo Osaka). On January 31, 2021, Hashioka joined Sint-Truiden on loan for the remainder of the 2020-21 season.

Personal life
He is the younger brother of fellow footballer Kazuki Hashioka.

Club statistics
Updated to 5 February 2021

National team statistics

References

External links
Profile at Urawa Red Diamonds

1999 births
Living people
Association football people from Saitama Prefecture
Japanese footballers
Japanese expatriate footballers
J1 League players
Belgian Pro League players
Urawa Red Diamonds players
Sint-Truidense V.V. players
Association football defenders
Japan international footballers
Footballers at the 2020 Summer Olympics
Olympic footballers of Japan
Japanese expatriate sportspeople in Belgium
Expatriate footballers in Belgium